George Anthony Metzler, Jr. (1912 to June 3, 1949) was an American racecar driver. Metzler was killed attempting to qualify for the 1949 Indianapolis 500

Metzler had attended the Indianapolis 500 as a boy and young man, and his uncle Edwin Metzler had participated in the race as a riding mechanic in 1936 and '37. In his 20s, he had started racing on dirt tracks in the Midwest. He was drafted into the United States Army during World War II and saw combat in Japan. He first attempted to qualify for the Indy 500 in 1947, but had his car break down during the drivers test. Unable to get a car running in 1948, he came back to the track in 1949 driving an older car that had first entered the race in 1936. Having difficulty getting enough speed from the car to qualify, Metzler was perhaps too careless trying to get in to the field the final day, and drove into the wall in turn one. He suffered numerous injuries, and died six days later, leaving behind a wife and two children. George Metzler is buried in Holy Cross and Saint Joseph Cemetery in Indianapolis, IN.

Sources
Terry Reed, Indy: The Race and Ritual of the Indianapolis 500. Potomac Books Inc.; Second edition (April 1, 2005). Pages 62–76

1949 deaths
Racing drivers who died while racing
Sports deaths in Indiana
Burials in Indiana
1912 births

FindAGrave.com memorial for George Metzler